Ivor Colin Docker (known as Colin; 3 December 1925 – 4 November 2014) was the 2nd Anglican Bishop of Horsham from 1975 until 1991 and the first area bishop from the area scheme's institution in 1984.

Educated at King Edward's School, Birmingham, Birmingham University (whence he gained a Master of Arts {MA}) and St Catherine's Society, Oxford, he studied for ordination at Wycliffe Hall, Oxford before embarking on an ecclesiastical career with a curacy in Normanton, Yorkshire. From 1954 he was Area Secretary of the CMS and, after spells as Vicar of Midhurst and Seaford  he was appointed Rural Dean of Eastbourne in 1971. Four years later he was appointed to become Bishop of Horsham, a suffragan bishop in the Diocese of Chichester; he was consecrated a bishop by Donald Coggan, Archbishop of Canterbury, at Westminster Abbey on 31 January 1975. A keen photographer, he retired to Bovey Tracey in 1991, where he continued to serve the church as an honorary assistant bishop within the Diocese of Exeter.

References

1925 births
2014 deaths
People educated at King Edward's School, Birmingham
Alumni of the University of Birmingham
Alumni of St Catherine's College, Oxford
Bishops of Horsham